The Llangernyw Yew is an ancient yew (Taxus baccata) in the village of Llangernyw, Conwy, North Wales. The tree is fragmented and its core part has been lost, leaving several enormous offshoots.

History

This yew tree lives in the churchyard of St. Digain's Church in Llangernyw village. Although it is very hard to determine the age of yew trees, the churchyard gate holds a certificate from the Yew Tree Campaign in 2002, signed by David Bellamy, which states that "according to all the data we have to hand" the tree is dated to between 4,000 and 5,000 years old. There is an alternative theory that presumes the tree is only as old as the adjacent saint site, which would make it around 1,500 years old.

In the mid-1990s the church oil tank stood in the space between the two trunk fragments; however, this was moved when it was realised that the tree was ancient. When this tank was built a lot of the dead wood was removed from the site which makes dating the age of the tree more difficult for dendrochronologists. In June 2002, the Tree Council, in celebration of the Golden Jubilee of Queen Elizabeth II designated the Llangernyw Yew tree one of the Fifty Great British trees in recognition of its place in national heritage.

Legend of the Angelystor
According to local tradition, the church of Llangernyw is inhabited by an ancient spirit known as Angelystor (the "Recording Angel" or "Evangelist" in Welsh). This tradition holds that every year at Halloween a booming voice foretells the names of parishioners who will die the following year. Folklore tells of a disbelieving local man, Siôn Ap Rhobert, who challenged the existence of the spirit one Halloween night only to hear his own name called out, followed by his death within the year.

See also

 List of oldest trees
 List of Great British Trees
 List of individual trees
 Fortingall Yew

Notes

References

Harte, J. (1996). "How old is that old yew?" At the Edge 4: 1–9. Available online.
Kinmonth, F. (2006). "Ageing the yew – no core, no curve?" International Dendrology Society Yearbook 2005: 41–46.

External links

Ancient Yew Group – Fragmented Yews in Churchyards

Individual yew trees
Llangernyw
Tourist attractions in Conwy County Borough
Individual trees in Wales
Oldest trees